Italian ship Vittorio Veneto may refer to:

  - a 
  - a unique helicopter carrying cruiser

Vittorio Veneto